Ciucaș may refer to:

 Ciucaș Mountains, a mountain range in Southern Carpathians, Romania
 Ciucaș Peak, the highest peak of Ciucaş Mountains
 Ciucaș, an alternative name for the river Homorod, a tributary of the Olt in Romania
 , a natural reserve in Romania

See also 
 Ciuc (disambiguation)